The May 2010 Mogadishu bombings were an attack at a mosque near the Bakaara market in Mogadishu, the capital of Somalia, on . The bombs killed at least 39 people and injured around 70 others.

Background
Somalia, which has not had a functional central government since the 1991 deposing of President Siad Barre, is controlled by several different factions.  The area of the capital where the bombings occurred, including the mosque and the Bakaara Market, was under the control of al-Shabaab, a militant organisation that was engaged in a struggle against the provisional Transitional Federal Government.

Bombings
The bombings occurred around  local time (10:00 UTC). The bombs were placed at opposite ends of the ground floor of the Abdala Shideye Mosque as people were awaiting the Dhuhr midday prayers. It is believed that Fuad Mohamed Qalaf, an upper-level official within al-Shabaab, was the intended target of the attacks. Qalaf was reported to have suffered only minor injuries to his hands.

The attack was the deadliest in Mogadishu since the Hotel Shambo bombing in December 2009. Information Minister Dahir Mohamud Gelle said it was the first such attack in a mosque in Somalia.

Reaction
Ambassador Boubacar Gaoussou Diarra, representing the African Union, said "Indiscriminate attacks on public places like today's incident cannot be condoned. I, on behalf of the African Union, would like to call upon all warring parties in the Somali Conflict to stop such barbaric attacks on innocent civilian population."

While al-Shabaab has accused private Western security firms, no group has claimed any kind of responsibility for the bombings.

See also
2010 timeline of the War in Somalia
2011 Mogadishu bombing
List of terrorist incidents, 2010
Somali Civil War
Somali Civil War (2009–present)

References

Attacks in Africa in 2010
Mass murder in 2010
Improvised explosive device bombings in Somalia
Terrorist incidents in Somalia in 2010
21st century in Mogadishu
Somali Civil War (2009–present)
May 2010 events in Africa
Terrorist incidents in Mogadishu